Iatt is an unincorporated community in Grant Parish, in the U.S. state of Louisiana.

History
Iatt most likely is named after a sub-tribe of the Comanche Indians. A post office called Iatt was established in 1879, and remained in operation until 1919.

References

Unincorporated communities in Louisiana
Unincorporated communities in Grant Parish, Louisiana